Peppermint Soda is a 1977 French comedy-drama film directed by Diane Kurys. This autobiographical film was her directorial debut, and it won the prestigious Prix Louis-Delluc at the 1977 Cannes Film Festival.

The film follows two teenage sisters over the course of the year 1963, with the title referring to a grown-up carbonated beverage that the younger sister drinks in a café. The high school where the film takes place is the Lycée Jules-Ferry in Paris, France. The film is partly based on director Kurys’ experiences, and opens with a title card that states: “For my sister—who still hasn’t given me back my orange sweater.”

Plot 
The film opens in September 1963 where 13-year-old Anne Weber and her 15-year-old sister Frédérique are spending the summer holiday with their newly divorced father on the coast. They then return to Paris live with their mother for the school year. The girls attend a strict all-girls school, the Lycée Jules-Ferry.

The first half of the movie mainly focuses on the younger Anne—the more introverted of the two. At school, Anne is not an achiever and is mocked by a teacher for a substandard drawing during art class. She’s upset at her mother for not buying her stockings, since everyone else at the school wears them. Anne is also anxious to get her period because it signifies reaching womanhood, and so she pretends she has menstrual cramps despite not actually having begun her period. She and her friends discuss what they know about sex and humorously reveal their lack of knowledge about it. She also sneaks a look at the letters sent between Frédérique and her boyfriend Marc, and falsely claims to her school friends Marc is her boyfriend.

The second half of the film focuses on Frédérique. Though she has a boyfriend Marc, she starts to lose interest in him as she becomes more politically active around the issue of the Algerian War and her Jewish identity. Her new interest in activism causes a falling out with her wealthy friend Perrine. Frédérique befriends the outspoken Pascale, a classmate who gives a horrific account to her class of a peaceful protest against far-right extremists that was violently broken up by French police.

Another of Frédérique’s school friends, Muriel, runs away, and rumors and gossip abound as to where she might have gone to. When visiting with Muriel’s worried father, the older man makes a pass at Frédérique just before she leaves the house. Muriel eventually returns briefly and reveals she dropped out of school and now lives with a boyfriend. Frédérique also becomes involved in school plays. On the opening night of a play she stars in, her father attends, but to Frédérique’s dismay, he does not stay afterwards to congratulate her. The film concludes with the girls, a little older and wiser, returning to their father’s home on the beach for holiday.

Cast

Production
Diane Kurys had no prior directorial experience, saying prior to the film she had “never held a camera or even taken a still photograph." She conceived of the idea for the film when she "began thinking that there are a lot of films about adolescent boys, since most directors are men, but there are very few films about girls in high school and how they're raised. I decided to make this film out of my own memories." Kurys added,  “But I didn't want to make adolescence a happy time. I wanted to show that it's difficult to be a 13-year-old girl, to want something desperately even if it's only a pair of pantyhose and to have nobody understand you.”

Kurys received partial funding for the film through a grant program, in addition to the support of Gaumont. Said Kurys, "[Gaumont] were very skeptical, as you can imagine, but at that time I had such energy and conviction that they finally said, ‘Maybe she's crazy, but let's give her a try.'” Kurys drew on her own experiences as a young adolescent, setting the film at the same lycée she attended and partly basing the characters on her real-life sister and herself. Filming began on August 1977.

Eléonore Klarwein was the same age as her character during filming. Klarwein, who had no previous acting experience, recalled the most challenging scenes for her to film were, "First, the one where I have my period, because I didn't have it in reality and because it touched on the intimate. Then, the one where I take a bath with my sister who puts her toes in my mouth. Disgusting. On top of that, I'm topless in the bathtub and it was embarrassing. Finally, the one where my sister makes me fall from a sofa: there, I hurt myself."

The film's music was composed by Yves Simon. Simon contributed the title song “Diabolo Menthe”, which became a hit song in France.

Release 
Peppermint Soda was released in France on 14 December 1977, where it was a box office success, earning "70,000 admissions the first week" and became a cult classic. The film drew comparisons to Francois Truffaut’s The 400 Blows, another French coming-of-age film that was set in a similar time period. It won the Louis Delluc Prize at the Cannes Film Festival.

It was released in North America on 15 July 1979 and was reviewed positively. Janet Maslin of The New York Times called it an "expert, utterly charming movie" that is "sweet and buoyant in its innocence." Kurys continued Anne's story in the 1980 film Cocktail Molotov, a companion piece which is set in 1968.

Re-release 
The film was digitally restored by the Cohen Film Collection in 2018 for its 40th anniversary. Writing of the restored version, Robert Abele of the Los Angeles Times wrote, “'Peppermint Soda' is, like its summer-cooling namesake, a concoction that signifies childhood, a refreshment likely to spark a memory. Kurys’ fondness for that time of fumbling and outgrowing is as fresh today as it was when it heralded a perceptive new filmmaking talent, especially because underneath these affectionately extracted remembrances is an unshakeable sisterly bond — of admiration, exasperation and watchfulness — that gives the story of Anne and Frédérique a deeper hold."

The 2K restoration was released on Blu-ray on 12 February 2019.

References

External links 

Peppermint Soda at AllMovie
Peppermint Soda at Rotten Tomatoes

1977 films
1970s coming-of-age comedy-drama films
Films directed by Diane Kurys
Films set in 1963
Films set in Paris
Films shot in Paris
French coming-of-age comedy-drama films
1970s French-language films
Gaumont Film Company films
Louis Delluc Prize winners
1977 directorial debut films
1977 comedy films
1977 drama films
Films about sisters
Films about puberty
Films about Jews and Judaism
1970s female buddy films
French female buddy films
Films about divorce
Films about mother–daughter relationships
1970s French films